Myersville is an unincorporated community in Summit County, in the U.S. state of Ohio.

History
Myersville was founded ca. 1876. The community was named for J. B. Myers, the original owner of the town site. A post office called Myersville was established in 1882, and remained in operation until 1909.

References

Unincorporated communities in Summit County, Ohio
Unincorporated communities in Ohio